This page provides a list of schools in Bangalore, India.

Historical schools in Bangalore and their year of establishment

 United Mission School (1832)
 St John's High School (1854)
 Goodwill's Girls School (1855)
 St. Joseph's Boys' High School (1858)
 Bishop Cotton Boys' School (1865)
 Bishop Cotton Girls' School (1865)
 Cathedral High School (1866)
 Baldwin Boys' High School (1880)
 Baldwin Girls' High School (1880)
 St. Joseph's Indian High School (1904)
 St Anthony's Boys' School (1913)
 Clarence High School (1914)
 National High School (1917)
 St. Germain High School (1944)
 Bangalore Military School (1946)
 Sophia High School (1949)

Schools in Bangalore

See also
 :Category:Schools in Bangalore
 :Category:International schools in Bangalore

References

Bangalore
Schools in Bangalore
Schools